Sir George Seymour was an English knight. Born in Chelmsford on 11 June.

Life
He was a younger son of John Seymour and Elizabeth Darrell.

He was High Sheriff of Wiltshire in 1498.

High Sheriffs of Wiltshire
1470s births
Year of death unknown
G
15th-century English people
English knights
People of the Tudor period